Goldstar is a privately held event discovery service based in Pasadena, California that sells tickets to leisure activities such as live entertainment, theatre, concerts, dance, film screenings, and sporting events. The company serves markets in 26 metro areas including San Diego, Los Angeles, San Francisco, Las Vegas, Chicago, Washington, D.C., New York City, Boston, Seattle, Minneapolis–Saint Paul, Sacramento, Portland, Houston, Dallas, Philadelphia and Miami. It focuses on young people who may not ordinarily choose to go to live events, and custom-tailors content for its members based on preferences.

Goldstar's business is both web and mobile-based and has membership exceeding 7 million. They have 4,000 venue partners.

The current CEO is Co-Founder Jim McCarthy.

History

Goldstar debuted February 14, 2002 and was launched by e-commerce experts Jim McCarthy, Richard Webster and Robert Graff. The web site was the first to introduce user reviews and event ratings online for the live entertainment industry. In April 2011, Goldstar appointed Neil Patrick Harris, Sean Moriarty and Matt Coffin to the Advisory Board.

In September 2011, Goldstar sold its 5 millionth ticket and introduced its patent-pending "Sit with Friends" feature.

References

External links
 Goldstar

Online retailers of the United States
Companies based in Los Angeles County, California
Companies based in Pasadena, California
Internet properties established in 2002
Ticket sales companies
2002 establishments in California